Miruthan is a 2016 Indian Tamil-language action horror film written and directed by Shakti Soundar Rajan, starring Jayam Ravi, Lakshmi Menon and Anikha Surendran. D. Imman composed the music, while Venkatesh S. handled the cinematography. Shot in Ooty and Coimbatore within 54 days, the film derives its title from a hybrid of two words, Mirugam meaning animal and Manithan meaning man.

The film depicts a zombie apocalypse in the state of Tamil Nadu that starts after a poisonous liquid spills from a container outside a chemical laboratory in Ooty. Karthik is a traffic police officer who learns of the outbreak when his sister goes missing, and he finds himself attacked by some zombies. He teams up with some doctors to escape from Ooty to Coimbatore and find a cure for the outbreak, while zombies keep spreading from city to city.

Prior to its release, the film faced issues when the Central Board of Film Certification granted it an A (adults only) rating. The makers approached the revising committee that passed the film with a U/A (parental guidance) rating.

Along with a Telugu dubbed version titled Yamapasham, the film was released theatrically on 19 February 2016 before the 2016 Tamil Nadu Legislative Assembly election. Miruthan has also been screened at multiple film festivals such as the Neuchâtel International Fantastic Film Festival, the Fantasia International Film Festival (the second Tamil film after Enthiran to get selected for this festival), the MOTELx - Lisbon International Horror Film Festival, the Morbido Film Fest, the Sitges Film Festival, the Yubari International Fantastic Film Festival and the Bucheon International Fantastic Film Festival. Later, Jayam Ravi introduced plans to make the sequel Miruthan 2 as a superhero film so as to cater to younger audiences as well.

Plot
The opening scene shows a container of poisonous liquid being spilt from a transport vehicle at a chemical laboratory in Ooty. A stray dog consumes it and turns violent, which then bites a security guard. The security guard turns into a zombie within hours and starts a chain of human infections via bites.

Back to the present, Karthik is a traffic police sub-inspector in Ooty who avoids all kinds of dangers as he takes care of his younger sister Vidya, who is in her early teens. Both are orphans but live with Karthik's friend Chinnamalai, a traffic police constable. Karthik is in love with a cardiology doctor named Renuka aka Renu, but never proposes in all their meetings. Renu is engaged and is about to marry an NRI named Naveen, who is also a cardiologist. One day Karthik messes up with Minister Gurumoorthy by allowing an auto carrying pregnant women in the Minister's way. Next day morning, Karthik finds that his sister Vidya goes missing while looking for her he was suddenly attacked by Zombies. At the same time, the police of Ooty are informed of the outbreak and get orders to shoot anyone who has turned into a zombie. Karthik is looking for Vidya by sticking posters of his missing sister on walls and killing some zombies in his way. He receives a call in which he is told to arrive at a place to find his sister. There, he finds Renu and a group of doctors, including the Chief doctor Dharan, all working on finding a vaccine to cure all the zombies. At Renu's house, Karthik and Chinnamalai find Minister Gurumoorthy, who is the father of Renu and learns that the Minister has kidnapped Vidya for vengeance, He finds Vidhya at a swimming pool surrounded by Minister Gurumoorthy's zombified henchman and finds that Zombies are allergic to water. Renu tells Karthik to save the doctors who are trapped inside the house, which is invaded by zombies.

Escorted by Karthik, the team comprising Dharan, Renu, another doctor Kamal, Renu's father Minister Gurumoorthy, Chinnamalai, and Vidya, the group heads to Coimbatore, where they are to use medical equipment to find a cure to the tragedy. But Dharan was already scratched by a zombie, so he was not getting infected immediately. He doesn't reveal this to anyone, fearing for his safety. When they near Mettuplayam, they were shocked to see that the infection had already spread in Coimbatore. The zombies crowd around the police van, so Karthik is forced to rash-drive the van to kill the zombies one by one.

Later, Gurumoorthy unknowingly disturbs some zombies, and Karthik ended up having to shoot them, which attracts many other zombies around. Then they all are forced to take shelter in a mall, opposite the hospital. Meanwhile, Naveen is inside the hospital trying to find the vaccine. They get ahold of Shri, a frightened security guard of the mall.

After a few hours, Dharan turns into a zombie and bites Vidya. Karthik kills Dharan with his gun, but Vidya does not turn into a zombie despite the fact that she was attacked almost an hour ago. Kamal says that she will be able to help them in finding the vaccine as she has the required antibodies and immunity. Karthik had to escort them to the hospital, which faces the mall. For this, he uses pressurized water from the mall's fire truck, knowing that they are allergic to water. Despite the reduced time, Karthik manages to bring everyone safely to the hospital except Renu. He goes back to the mall to bring Renu, but he does that without any water source. So he leads Renu to the hospital but was bitten by the zombies while escorting her. He himself slowly turns into a zombie, but he safely escorts her to the hospital before his human feelings lose and also advises Renu to shoot him. But she is too adamant about knowing the reason why he had saved her, despite the uncaring Naveen's attempts and her selfish father, and realizes his love for her, but Karthik turns into a zombie. Thus, Renu shoots him.

The doctors find the required antidote and start dealing with the virus. Later, Karthik, now completely a zombie, is seen on top of a bus which is going to Chennai, implying that Renu did not shoot Karthik properly and hence he has survived the attack. The story will be continued in a sequel to this film.

Cast
 Jayam Ravi as Traffic Sub-Inspector Karthik, a police officer who loves Dr Renuka. One day, he is assigned to kill the citizens of Ooty who have turned into zombies due to infectious bites. But at last, he himself is attacked by the zombies and is presumed to be killed by Renuka. 
 Lakshmi Menon as Dr Renuka, Karthik's love interest and Dr Naveen's would-be. She always thinks bad about Karthik, but after she kills him as he has become a zombie, she realises his good nature and his true love for her, and hence feels sorry for him. 
 Anikha Surendran as Vidhya, Karthik's only sister who is attacked by Dr Dharan after he becomes a zombie, but she survives the attack because she has the immunity power, which later helps the other doctors to find the vaccine. 
 Sriman as Shri, the frightened mall security who escorts the main characters to the shopping area. He is the main comedian. 
 R. N. R. Manohar as Minister Guru Moorthy, who is brave towards innocents but is timid towards zombies. He is a sadist. 
 Kaali Venkat as Constable Chinnamalai, Karthik's best friend who helps him in saving his sister from the zombies. He is the main relief by giving comedies. 
 Jeeva Ravi as Chief Dr Dharan, who later turns into a zombie due to an attack and attacks Vidhya, but is killed by Karthik. 
 Crane Manohar as Wedding Broker. He suggests Karthik marry some Chennai-based girls.
 Amit Bhargav as Dr Naveen, Renuka's would-be who is also a sadist. 
 Nellai Siva as Gurumoorthy's henchman and comedian
 Raghavan Durairaj as Assistant Dr. Kamal. He suggests to Karthik that Vidhya is their saviour. He successfully finds the vaccine antibody through her.
 Dhilip Rayan as Karthik's friend

Production
The film was announced on 14 January 2015, after the shooting of Ravi's another project of the year, Romeo Juliet was completed. Filming began in March 2015, after Jayam Ravi accepted an offer from Shakti Soundar Rajan to feature in a film produced by Michael Rayappan. Lakshmi Menon subsequently joined the team to portray the film's heroine. The team shot for thirty days in Ooty in May 2015, before returning to Chennai to complete portions. In July 2015, a schedule was held at Binny Mills, where the art direction team had erected a set costing 1.5 crore rupees. As of January 2016, the filming was completely ended.

Soundtrack

D. Imman composed the soundtrack for both the Tamil and the Telugu versions, with durations overlapping.

Release
The film was later dubbed into Hindi and Malayalam. In Hindi, it was released with the name as Daring Rakhwala on zee cinema and in Malayalam, it was released with the same name of the original title 'Miruthan'.

Reception
Sudhir Srinivasan of The Hindu said that Miruthan was an inconsistent ‘zombie’ film with excessive melodrama. Latha Srinivasan of dna gave 2 stars and said, "The zombies of Hollywood won't do a far better job of entertaining you than Miruthan. Times of India gave 2.5/5 and wrote, "Like, you want to praise the makers for trying something different — the first zombie film in Tamil cinema, in this case — but immediately, you are worst with another thought: 'Did the first zombie film in Tamil have to be this clumsy and unexciting?'Behindwoods gave the film 2.75/5 and stated, "For audiences who have seen Hollywood zombie films, Miruthan would be an old experience. And kudos definitely to Shakthi Sounder Rajan for attempting something different from the usual themes that Tamil cinema is known to churn out film after film." Film critic Sreedhar Pillai expressed via Twitter that the "interval creates the impression (that the) 1st half (is) worst than 2nd half" while the climax was "long drawn out", giving the film a 0.5/5.  IndiaGlitz.com rated the film 1.3/5 and stated, " Miruthan- Sores a lot and little else

Box office
The film collected  in Tamil Nadu in first weekend and  worldwide.

Possible Sequel
In March 2016, Shakti Soundar Rajan announced his plans to make a sequel of the film in the future. He later began a different film featuring Jayam Ravi in the lead role titled Tik Tik Tik.

References

External links
 

2016 films
2010s Tamil-language films
2010s action horror films
Indian action horror films
Apocalyptic films
Films shot in Ooty
Films shot in Coimbatore
Indian zombie films